The National Health and Family Planning Commission of the People's Republic of China (NHFPC) was a cabinet-level executive department under the State Council which is responsible for providing information, raising health awareness and education, family planning, ensuring the accessibility of health services, monitoring the quality of health services provided to citizens and visitors in the mainland, population and family planning in the People's Republic of China. In March 2018, the ministry was dissolved and its functions were integrated into the new agency called the National Health Commission.

History 
The Ministry is created from the former Ministry of Health and National Population and Family Planning Commission. This was announced at the 2013 National People's Congress.

From 16 March 2013 to March 2018, the commission is headed by Li Bin.

Functions and responsibilities 
The commission reports directly to the State Council. Its functions include:

Drafting laws, regulations, plans and policies related to public health
Formulating policies for maternity and child-care programs
Overseeing disease prevention and treatment
Controlling the spread of epidemics
Supervising blood collection
Reforming medical institutions
Overseeing state hospitals
Drawing up medical science and technology development projects
Setting quality standards for foods and cosmetics
Overseeing medical education and setting related standards
Controlling the Beijing Medical College and the Chinese Academy of Medical Sciences; and
Overseeing the State Administration of Traditional Chinese Medicine
Population control
Family planning

List of Ministers

See also 
 Family planning policy of Mainland China
 One-child policy

References

External links 
 National Health and Family Planning Commission
National Health and Family Planning Commission 
 Ministry of Health
 The State Council
Ministry of Health 
 "Critical health literacy: a case study from China in schistosomiasis control"
"Children's Health and Care" in China.
 "Relationship with China's Ministry of Health and the Chinese Nursing Association" in the University of Michigan.

Medical and health organizations based in China
China
Health
Defunct government departments of China
China, Health
2013 establishments in China
2018 disestablishments in China
Organizations based in Beijing
Family planning
Demographics of China
Ministries disestablished in 2018